Caribou Lake is a small circular lake in North Bay, Ontario, Canada, located between Wilson Road and Widdifield Road.

See also
List of lakes in Ontario

References

Lakes of Nipissing District
Landforms of North Bay, Ontario